Constanze Paulinus (born 9 July 1985 in Berlin) is a German former competitive figure skater. She won five senior international medals, including gold at the 2008 Cup of Nice, and three German national medals.

Personal life
Constanze Paulinus was born in Berlin, Germany. In mid-1993, following her parents' divorce, she moved with her mother and sister to North East England. She returned to Germany in August 2002, settling in Erfurt.

Career
Paulinus began skating at age five and trained in Berlin until she was eight. After moving to the U.K., she was coached by Catherine Barker in Billingham, by Debbie and Simon Briggs in Sunderland and Dundee, and by Joy Sutcliff in Ayr and Nottingham. At the British Championships, Paulinus won silver on the novice level in the 2000–01 season and junior gold the following season. The National Ice Skating Association decided not to send her to the 2002 World Junior Championships, believing she was not ready.

In August 2002, Paulinus' parents sent her to Erfurt, Germany to train under Ilona Schindler. She began representing her birth country internationally after sitting out the mandatory two years. She received two ISU Junior Grand Prix assignments in 2004, finishing fourth in Germany and eighth in Serbia. She also competed on the senior level, winning the silver medal at the 2004 Bofrost Cup on Ice. 

In the 2005–06 season, Paulinus was invited to a senior Grand Prix event, the 2005 Skate America, where she finished seventh. She switched coaches in May 2007, joining Karin Hendschke-Raddatz in Berlin. In 2008–09, she won three international medals — gold at the Cup of Nice, bronze at the NRW Trophy, and bronze at the Challenge Cup — and silver at the German Championships.

Paulinus did not compete in the 2009–10 season due to foot surgery in November and hip surgery in December 2009. She retired from competition after placing fifth at the 2011 German Championships.

Programs

Competitive highlights
GP: Grand Prix; JGP: Junior Grand Prix

References

External links

 Official website 
 

1985 births
German female single skaters
Living people
Figure skaters from Berlin
Competitors at the 2009 Winter Universiade
Competitors at the 2011 Winter Universiade